Adam Darragh (born 16 August 1979) is an Australian professional basketball player.  Born in Gold Coast, Queensland, Darragh attended Martin Methodist College in Tennessee in 2001–02. He previously played in the Australian NBL for the Brisbane Bullets from 2003–2005 and the West Sydney Razorbacks during 2005–06. He then signed as a free agent with the New Zealand Breakers for 2006–07. He has also played many years in the Queensland Basketball League for the Gold Coast Rollers, his junior affiliated club.

References

External links
Australiabasket.com profile
QBL stats

1979 births
Living people
Australian expatriate basketball people in the United States
Australian men's basketball players
Basketball players from Brisbane
Brisbane Bullets players
Guards (basketball)
UT Southern FireHawks men's basketball players
New Zealand Breakers players
Sportspeople from the Gold Coast, Queensland
20th-century Australian people
21st-century Australian people